Viuda e hijas de Roque Enroll was an Argentine all-female band formed in 1983 in Buenos Aires. It was part of the renewal movement of Argentine rock (Spanish: rock nacional; "national rock") that occurred after the return to democracy in 1983, along with other "fun" and upbeat acts such as Los Twist, Los Abuelos de la Nada, Virus and Soda Stereo

History
Claudia Sinesi and Maria Gabriela Epumer met in 1978, and played together in a garage band. Epumer joined the cover band Rouge in 1982, and proposed that Sinesi joined it as well. The band broke up when the military junta forbade music in English language, as their set list was composed completely of covers of English-speaking bands. Sinesi and Epumer stayed together, and Mavi Diaz proposed them to start an all-girls band. Their first long play was released in 1984, with songs such as "Potpourri (Olla podrida)", "Te Encargo mi Modernidad" and "Bikini a Lunares, Amarillo, Diminuto, Justo Justo", a cover of Brian Hyland's single Itsy Bitsy Teenie Weenie Yellow Polkadot Bikini. The second long play included a popular cover of the song "Lollipop". 
 
The third album had lower sales, and the records label went into bankruptcy, leading to the break up of the band. The band reunited for concerts along the years.

Members
 Mavi Díaz (lead singer)
 María Gabriela Epumer (guitar, chorus)
 Claudia Sinesi (bass, chorus)
 Claudia Ruffinatti (keyboard, chorus)

Discography

Studio albums
 1984: Viuda e Hijas de Roque Enroll
 1985: Ciudad Catrúnica
 1986: Vale cuatro
 2003: Viuda e Hijas de Roque Enroll (simple)

Live albums
 1995: Telón de crep

Compilations
 1994: Grandes éxitos
 1995: El álbum
 2003: Oro

References

Argentine rock music groups
All-female bands
Musical groups established in 1983
Musical groups disestablished in 1986
Rock en Español music groups